Dolenja Ravan (locally also Dolenje Ravni) is a small settlement in the hills above Poljane nad Škofjo Loko in the Municipality of Gorenja Vas–Poljane in the Upper Carniola region of Slovenia.

Name
Locally, Dolenja Ravan is known as Dolenje Ravni. The name Dolenja Ravan literally means 'lower flatland, lower plateau' (in contrast to neighboring Gorenja Ravan; literally, 'upper flatland, upper plateau'). The common noun ravan 'flatland, plateau' is relatively common in Slovene toponyms.

Notable people
Notable people that were born or lived in Dolenja Ravan include:
Gregor Jereb (1845–1893), journalist
Maks Miklavčič (1900–1971), historian

References

External links 

Dolenja Ravan on Geopedia

Populated places in the Municipality of Gorenja vas-Poljane